Kokkal is a small village located 35 km from Kodaikanal.  Around 500 houses are there. The major religion is Hinduism.  There are many tourist places to see, such as 'Kokkal lake', 'Kokkal falls' and 'Pura kal'(dove stone). The Mariyamman temple festival (mavilakku) is famous here.  The temple is located at the Bankof Kokkal river.

Villages in Nilgiris district